Brian O'Neill Afanador Pérez (born March 6, 1997) is a Puerto Rican table tennis player.

On April 2, 2016, Afanador made history becoming the first Puerto Rican male table tennis player to qualify for the Olympic Games. On June 3, 2016, Afanador upset number 10 seeded and number 44 in the International Table Tennis Federation world ranking Bojan Tokič at the 2016 ITTF Slovenia Open in Otočec, Slovenia. He competed at the 2016 Summer Olympics where he defeated Suraju Saka 4–3 in the preliminary round before losing to Omar Assar 4–2 in the second round.

Clubs
  TTC indeland Jülich (2017–2018)
  4S Tours TT (2018–present)

Personal life 
Afanador was born on March 6, 1997, and has one younger brother. He is the cousin of the table tennis Díaz sisters, Adriana, Melanie, Fabiola, and Gabriela.

On August 23, 2020, Afanador announced he and his wife Noralis Soé Ruiz Lugo, a public relations professional, were expecting their first child together. On September 25, they announced they were expecting a girl who was born on December 20, 2020, and named Antonella Isabelle. Afanador and Ruiz officially got married in February 2023.

Achievements
 2020-2021 Olympic Games
 2019 Pan American Games – Bronze Medal - Mixed Double
 2019 Pan American Games – Bronze Medal - Double
 2018 Central American and Caribbean Games – Gold Medal - Mixed Double
 2018 Central American and Caribbean Games – Silver Medal - Team
 2018 Central American and Caribbean Games – Bronce Medal - Individual
 2018 Central American and Caribbean Games – Bronce Medal - Double
 2016 Olympic Games
 2016 Latin American Champion
 2015 Pan American Games – Bronze Medal - Team
 2015 US Open (tennis) – Junior Boys Champion
 2014 Central American and Caribbean Games – Gold Medal - Mixed Double
 2014 Central American and Caribbean Games – Gold Medal - Team
 2014 Central American and Caribbean Games – Silver Medal - Individual
 2014 Central American and Caribbean Games – Silver Medal - Double
 2014 Youth Olympic Games Qualifier 
 2014 Puerto Rico World Team Member
 2014 2013 Latin American Junior and Cadet Champion
 2012 Puerto Rico National Champion 
 2010 Central American and Caribbean Games – Bronce Medal - Double

References

https://butterflyonline.com/players/brian-afanador/

External links

1997 births
Living people
People from Utuado, Puerto Rico
Puerto Rican table tennis players
Table tennis players at the 2014 Summer Youth Olympics
Table tennis players at the 2016 Summer Olympics
Olympic table tennis players of Puerto Rico
Pan American Games medalists in table tennis
Pan American Games bronze medalists for Puerto Rico
Central American and Caribbean Games gold medalists for Puerto Rico
Central American and Caribbean Games silver medalists for Puerto Rico
Central American and Caribbean Games bronze medalists for Puerto Rico
Competitors at the 2014 Central American and Caribbean Games
Competitors at the 2018 Central American and Caribbean Games
Table tennis players at the 2015 Pan American Games
Table tennis players at the 2019 Pan American Games
Central American and Caribbean Games medalists in table tennis
Medalists at the 2015 Pan American Games
Medalists at the 2019 Pan American Games
Table tennis players at the 2020 Summer Olympics
21st-century Puerto Rican people